In molecular biology, U108 belongs to the H/ACA family of snoRNAs.
The sequence is predicted to guide the pseudouridylation of the U372 residue in the 28S rRNA subunit. However it has not been reported as a pseudouridylation site.

References

External links 
 

Small nuclear RNA